Tatevik Manukyan (born 19 March 1981) is an Armenian former footballer who played as a midfielder. She has been a member of the Armenia women's national team.

See also
List of Armenia women's international footballers

References

1991 births
Living people
Women's association football midfielders
Armenian women's footballers
Armenia women's international footballers